Sybra palliata is a species of beetle in the family Cerambycidae. It was described by Pascoe in 1865. It is known from Borneo.

References

palliata
Beetles described in 1865